Century City Mall is a shopping mall within the Century City complex in Poblacion, Makati, Metro Manila, Philippines.

History
The mall was under construction in 2013 and the opening of the mall was initially planned in the fourth quarter of 2013. By July 2013, painting works for the mall's interior and exterior including its roof were effectively complete with some finishing touches to be done. The elevators were installed and functional and tiles were installed in common areas of the mall. In June, the lease spaces were turned over for tenants for fit-out works and completed fit-out works and finishing by January 2014. During this period, the mall was ready to open with only cleaning work remaining. The mall's generator sets and CCTVs were tested during the period.

Century City Mall opened on February 17, 2014.

Architecture
Heat is minimized by the architectural design of the mall. The exterior of the Century City Mall was painted white to minimize the heat absorbed by the walls and roof and the Exterior Insulation Finishing System is used as the façade material to minimize absorption of heat by the mall's units, which in turn reduces the energy needed by the air conditioning. For the glassworks, tinted horizontal glass sheets were installed to reflect sunlight and minimize the heat entering the building as part of the designer's efforts to improve comfort to people inside the mall.

On the mall's roof garden situated on the fourth floor, natural ventilation and vegetation were installed to reduce temperature and filter the air inside the building. Through a series of sky lights, Natural light that passes inside the mall are filtered through all levels. In order to minimize water consumption, waterless urinals are installed inside the mall's restrooms.

Facilities
There are two entrances, one located along Kalayaan Avenue near the corner of Salamanca Street and another on General Luna Street. The mall also has digital cinemas. Three basement floors are allotted for parking space for around 527 vehicles. The mall has five floors above ground mainly for retail space and has  of gross floor area. Century City Development Corporation, a part of Century Properties Group was the mall's developer. Located at the fifth floor is the San Padre Pio Da Pietrelcina Chapel, a Roman Catholic chapel.

Tenants
The mall has  of net leasable space and by the first day of the mall's operation, more than 100 tenants has leased out the space including Marketplace by Rustan's. The mall hosts both local and international shops. The Century Properties Group said that the mall will primarily serve occupants of the Gramercy Residences and the Knightsbridge Residences as well as residents of nearby barangays and office in Makati.

References

External links

Shopping malls in Makati
Shopping malls established in 2014
Tourist attractions in Metro Manila